George Murphy (1902–1992) was an American actor and politician.

George Murphy may also refer to:

 George W. Murphy (1841–1920), Attorney General of Arkansas
 George Murphy (footballer) (1915–1983), Welsh association footballer
 George Murphy (Canadian politician), member of the Newfoundland and Labrador House of Assembly
 George Murphy (special effects artist), special effects artist (Forrest Gump)
 George A. Murphy (1923–2015), New York politician and judge